Astragalus sarcocolla (Greek σαρκοκόλλα, from σάρξ "flesh", and κόλλᾰ "glue"; Arabic anzarūṭ, ʿanzarūt, kuḥl fārisī, kuḥl kirmānī; Persian anzarūt, tashm (< čashm), kandjubā) is a historical shrub or tree from Persia, identified with a species of Astragalus (Papilionaceae), also denoting its balsam.

Plant 

Formerly, the genus Penaea, belonging to the Thymelaeaceae, was generally considered to be the original plant, namely either Penaea mucronata L., or Penaea sarcocolla L. or Penaea squamosa L. But in 1879 W. Dymock was able to prove that at least the Persian Sarcocolla is the product of what he called Astragalus sarcocolla Dym. (Leguminosae). Widely known in antiquity, the drug has practically disappeared from the European store of medicines, but, according to Meyerhof, it is still well known in the Orient, especially in the drugmarket in Cairo.

History 
Pliny (Historia Naturalis 24.128, 13.67) reports the use of sarcocolla as a paint and medicine.

Dioscorides (De materia medica 3.89) and Galenus mention its power of healing wounds.

The 8th century philosopher Al-Kindi used sarcocolla as a component of many recipes in his medical formulary (Akrabadhin), among others for leprosy.

The most detailed description is given by the 13th century botanist and pharmacologist Ibn al-Baytar on the basis of Greek and Arabic sources as well as his own observations. The resin consumes the festering flesh of putrescent abscesses, assists the ripening of tumours, carries away mucus and yellow gall, and is a remedy for inflammations of the eye, for agglutinating eyelids and for excessive secretion of the eye. Taken internally, the resin is a strong purgative, but causes also the hair to fall out. The best sarcocolla consists of crushed, white seeds, mixed with walnut oil. Measured out in different ways, it can be mingled with other drugs (sagapenum, myrobalanum, aloes, bdellium, etc.). When taken neat, the resin can be lethal; therefore, the dose should not be more than 2¼ dirhams. Ibn al-Baytar, however, maintains that he saw in Egypt women partaking, immediately after a bath, of up to 4 ounces of anzarūt, together with the pulp of the yellow melon, hoping to increase thus their corpulence.

According to the 13th century (?) Liber Ignium (Book of Fires) of Marcus Graecus, sarcocolla was an ingredient of Greek Fire.

The 16th century surgeon Brunus of Calabria recommended a plaster for skull fractures consisting of sarcocolla, bitter vetch meal, dragon's blood, and myrrh.

See also 
 Chrysocolla (gold-solder)
 Sarcocele

References 

sarcocolla
Resins
Traditional medicine
Incendiary weapons
History of pharmacy
Plants described in 1890